The New Zealand version of the NWA British Empire/Commonwealth Championship was a professional wrestling heavyweight championship defended in the National Wrestling Alliance-affiliated Dominion Wrestling Union from 1929 to 1953 and in All Star Pro Wrestling from 1968 to 1990. It was first won in 1929 by Canadian wrestler George Walker, who claimed the title upon his arrival in New Zealand, and defended the belt for seven years before leaving for a rival promotion in 1935. It was the second oldest championship after the NWA New Zealand Heavyweight Championship and had 36 officially recognized champions during its 60-year history.

Title history

Reigns

See also
List of National Wrestling Alliance championships

References

National Wrestling Alliance championships
Heavyweight wrestling championships
National professional wrestling championships
Professional wrestling in New Zealand